Saggart is a stop on the Luas light-rail tram system in Dublin, Ireland.  It opened in 2011 as the terminus of an extension of the Red Line.  The stop is located on a section of reserved track next to Citywest Drive near Saggart village in south-west Dublin.  It is also close to Whitechurch and Baldonnel.  To the north of the stop, a large area has been set aside for a development called Parklands, which is planned to include over 150 houses, two new schools, retail and a large sports area.  As of 2020, development has begun onsite.

Saggart has a similar layout to Tallaght Luas stop: there are two edge platforms, beyond which the track continues for around 80m where there is a double crossover.  One platform is used for arrivals and one for departures.

The stop is served by Dublin Bus route 69.

References

Luas Red Line stops in South Dublin (county)